Vickery is an English surname. Notable people with the surname include:

Alice Vickery (1844–1929), English physician and campaigner for women's rights
Brian Campbell Vickery (1918–2009), British information scientist
Eben Vickery (1910–1974), Australian politician
Ebenezer Vickery (1827–1906), Australian businessman, pastoralist and philanthropist
Edward Vickery (1823–1883), Canadian merchant, ship builder and politician
Frank Vickery (1951–2018), Welsh playwright and actor
Howard Leroy Vickery (1892–1946), U.S. Navy admiral and merchant shipbuilder
Hubert Bradford Vickery (1893–1978), Canadian-American biochemist
Joe Vickery (born 1989), English rugby league footballer
Joey Vickery (born 1967), Canadian basketball player
John Vickery (artist) (1906–1983), Australian artist
John Vickery (actor) (born 1950), American actor
John Vickery (footballer) (born 1951), Australian rules footballer
Joyce Winifred Vickery (1908–1979), Australian botanist
Lindsay Vickery (born 1965), Australian composer and performer
Mack Vickery (1938–2004), American musician and songwriter
Michael Vickery (1931–2017), American historian and author
Peter Vickery (1949/50–2022), Australian judge
Phil Vickery (chef) (born 1961), English celebrity chef 
Phil Vickery (rugby union) (born 1976), English rugby union footballer
Ray Vickery (born 1942), American attorney and politician
Samuel Vickery (1873–1952), British soldier
Sachia Vickery (born 1995), American tennis player
Tim Vickery (born 1965), English football journalist
Ty Vickery (born 1990), Australian rules footballer
Walter Vickery (1909–2000), Welsh rugby union player
William Kingston Vickery (1851–1925), American art dealer

See also
William Vickrey (1914–1996), Canadian-American professor of economics
A.E. Vickery, American schooner of the late 19th century
Vickery, Ohio, United States, an unincorporated community